Rita Aleksandri Sargsyan (née Dadayan, 6 March 1962 – 20 November 2020) was the wife of Serzh Sargsyan, the President of Armenia from 2008 to 2018.  She was born to a military family and was a music teacher by profession.

Biography 
In 1983, she married her husband Serzh. They have two daughters, Anush and Satenik and four grandchildren, Mariam, Rita, Ara, and Serzh.

Activities as First Lady 
Rita Sargsyan sponsored the Donate Life charity foundation, which assists children suffering from blood cancer and other severe diseases, as well as the Autism and Aragil national foundations. Since 2010 on Sargsyan was the Chairperson of Board of Trustees of the Foundation. The following international competitions were held under the auspices of First Lady Sargsyan, with notable events having included the Aram Khachaturian International Contest of Classical Music and the Yerevan International Music Festival hosted by the Armenian National Philharmonic Orchestra.

Death 
On 20 November 2020, Rita Sargsyan died from COVID-19 at the age of 58. Condolences were given by Prime Minister Nikol Pashinyan, noting that she "led valuable social and public activities aimed at fostering cultural life in the country." President Armen Sarksyan personally visited Serzh to express his condolences.

References 

1962 births
2020 deaths
People from Stepanakert
First ladies of Armenia
Deaths from the COVID-19 pandemic in Armenia